RecipeBridge is a vertical search engine for recipes,
founded by Milwaukee based entrepreneurs Andy Theimer and Bill
Brennan. It was established in December 2007 and a beta version was launched in 2008 which makes it the oldest dedicated recipe search engine on the web.

The current version was launched in April, 2009. As of July 2011, it searches through 350 different recipe sites and blogs with over 1.7 million recipes.

RecipeBridge allows users to search and filter results by keyword, cuisine, ingredient, meal, or
occasion. The results page provides users with the
brief description of the recipes and a number of ingredients
needed. Then the user can either go to the original recipe
page or further narrow the results by adding other
ingredients.

In July 2011 RecipeBridge has been acquired by the global food advertising network Gourmet
Ads with a goal "to build the largest recipe search engine, combining
recipe sites, blogs, food brands and supermarkets into one
destination".

References

External links 
 

American cooking websites
Domain-specific search engines